Türkgücü München is a German association football club from the city of Munich, Bavaria.

The club, which is based in the Turkish community of Munich, was formed in 2009 in a merger of Türkischer SV 1975 München and ATA Spor München. Türkischer SV 1975, in turn, succeeded SV Türk Gücü München in 2001 when the latter became insolvent. Türk Gücü was a successful third-division side in the second half of the 1980s and the early 1990s, when the club aimed as high as the German second division, without quite getting there.

History

SV Türk Gücü
The club was formed in 1975 by a handful of Turkish migrant workers in Munich, then under the name of SV Türk Gücü München (. Originally, the football team played in the lowest tiers of Munich amateur football, something that changed from 1983 onwards, when a number of wealthy Turkish businessmen took over the running of the club. The club found the Bezirksportanlage am Krehlebogen as a permanent home ground and was able to establish a youth department.

Türk Gücü, as the club was commonly referred to, earned a number of promotions, culminating in a 3–1 promotion decider victory over VfR Neuburg, played in front of 3,000 spectators, which earned the club entry to the fourth division Landesliga Bayern-Süd.

After its promotion to the Landesliga, Türk Gücü strengthened its team with non-Turkish players and, under coach Peter Grosser, the club won promotion to the Bayernliga in 1988, with future professionals like Gerry Hillringhaus and Thomas Kristl in the team. Türk Gücü was an instant success in Bavaria's highest football league, coming sixth in its first season, where it attracted as many as 12,000 spectators in the games against TSV 1860 Munich. The club was able to draw on up to 1,000 fans to travel with the team to away games. Hillringhaus, a goalie, scored Germany's goal of the month for September 1989 in a Bayernliga game against MTV Ingolstadt.

The club under chairman Ergun Berksoy, rivaled in its success in the German Turkish community only by Türkiyemspor Berlin, begun to aim even for professional football, hoping to earn promotion to the 2. Bundesliga. But the club was not able to live up to its ambitions. It finished seventh in the league in the following year, followed by a twelfth place in 1991 and relegation in 1992 after a bitter 4–3 defeat on penalties in the relegation decider against SC 08 Bamberg.

Fundamental changes started to affect the club. Support for the team had steadily declined, one reason being the large number of non-Turkish players in the club which affected the identification of the local Turkish population with the club. The other was the rise of Satellite television. Being able to watch Turkish giants Beşiktaş, Galatasaray and Fenerbahçe live on TV greatly reduced the number of Turkish people interested in seeing a third- or fourth-division side on the field and, consequently, the club's financial means. Nevertheless, the club's significance in Bavarian football was demonstrated in the fact that the Bavarian Football Associations fiftieth anniversary book had its own two-page article on Türk Gücü, something only awarded to Bavarian giants FC Bayern, TSV 1860, 1. FC Nürnberg and rising star SpVgg Unterhaching.

After the 1995–96 season Türk Gücü came second-last and fell to the fifth tier of German football. The club came close to promotion once more in 1998, when it finished second in its league but lost to 1. FC Nürnberg Amateure in the first round of the promotion matches.

The glory days of Türk Gücü were definitely over now and, in 2001, having become insolvent, the club was dissolved.<ref>Deutschlands Fussball in Zahlen –  Die Saison 2000/2001, p. 242</ref>

Türkischer SV
Players from Türk Gücü formed a new club called Türkischer SV 1975 München. The new team was not competitive in the Landesliga in 2001–02, finishing second to last, with only SV Lohhof behind it, another club who had only recently played at a much higher level. The team spent three seasons in the sixth tier Bezirksoberliga Oberbayern before another relegation in 2005 took it down to the Bezirksliga level.

The side played in the eastern division of this league, the Bezirksliga Oberbayern-Ost, but again as a lower table side with another relegation following in 2008, the season ATA Spor München entered the league and finished fifth.

Türkischer SV spent its last season before the merger, 2008–09, in the tier-nine Kreisliga München 3, where it achieved its only single-digit league finish in its eight season of existence.

ATA Spor
ATA Spor München was formed in 1981.

Unlike Türk Gücü, ATA Spor had never climbed the heights of Bavarian amateur football and promotion from the tier-eight Kreisliga followed by two seasons in the Bezirksliga just before the merger were the club's most successful era.

SV Türkgücü-Ataspor
On 19 May 2009, ATA Spor and Türkischer SV merged to form SV Türkgücü-Ataspor in an effort to combine the strength of the two clubs and form a strong side in the eastern suburbs of Munich. The new club had a membership of approximately 500 people.

The new club took up ATA Spor's place in the Bezirksliga Oberbayern-Nord, where it came eighth in 2010 and tenth in 2011, a long way from the glory days of the old Türk Gücü club.

In 2013, the club finished second and, via the promotion round, earned promotion to the Landesliga Bayern-Südost.

In 2019, the club finished first in the Bayernliga Süd and earned promotion to the fourth-tier Regionalliga Bayern.

Türkgücü München
After promotion, the club decided to shorten its name to Türkgücü München. Türkgücu were promoted to 3. Liga in 2020 and played its home games at Stadion an der Grünwalder Straße. For the 2020–21 season, the team has played their home matches at the Olympiastadion München and at Stadion an der Grünwalder Straße, sharing the latter stadium with their fellow 3. Liga side 1860 Munich. Türkgücü Munich filed for insolvency on January 31, 2022.  As a result, there is a risk of a deduction of 9 points due to No. 6b of the DFB rules of play due to an application to open insolvency proceedings. Due to insolvency, their season has been nullified and all points have been deducted.

Players
Current squad

Honours
The club's honours:

League
Regionalliga Bayern (IV)
Promoted: 2019–20
Bayernliga Süd (V)
Champions: 2018–19
Landesliga Bayern-Südost (VI)
Champions: 2017–18
Landesliga Bayern-Süd (V)
 Champions: 1987–88, 1993–94
 Runners-up: 1997–98

Bezirksliga Oberbayern-Nord (VII)
 Runners-up: 2012–13
Kreisliga 3 Schmid (VIII)
 Runners-up: 2006–07

Cup
 Bavarian Cup
 Winners: 2021

Recent seasons
The recent season-by-season performance of the club and its predecessors:Fussball.de – Ergebnisse  Tables and results of all German football leagues

SV Türk Gücü

Türkischer SV

ATA Spor

SV Türkgücü-Ataspor

Türkgücü München

With the introduction of the Bezirksoberligas in 1988 as the new fifth tier, below the Landesligas, all leagues below dropped one tier. With the introduction of the Regionalligas in 1994 and the 3. Liga in 2008 as the new third tier, below the 2. Bundesliga, all leagues below dropped one tier. With the establishment of the Regionalliga Bayern as the new fourth tier in Bavaria in 2012 the Bayernliga was split into a northern and a southern division, the number of Landesligas expanded from three to five and the Bezirksoberligas abolished. All leagues from the Bezirksligas onwards were elevated one tier.

References

Sources
 Die Bayernliga 1945–97  DSFS, published: 1998
 Die Deutsche Liga-Chronik 1945–2005  History of German football from 1945 to 2005 in tables, publisher: DSFS, published: 2006
 50 Jahre Bayrischer Fussball-Verband''  50-year-anniversary book of the Bavarian FA, publisher: Vindelica Verlag, published: 1996

External links

Türk SV München profile on Weltfussball.de  
Das deutsche Fußball-Archiv  historical German domestic league tables
Manfreds Fussball Archiv  Tables and results from the Bavarian amateur leagues

Football clubs in Germany
Association football clubs established in 1975
Football clubs in Munich
1975 establishments in West Germany
Turkish association football clubs outside Turkey
Migrant workers football clubs in Germany
3. Liga clubs